Santa Anatolia may refer to:

 Sant'Anatolia di Narco, municipality in the Province of Perugia in the Italian region Umbria
 Victoria, Anatolia, and Audax, martyrs and saints venerated by the Catholic Church